Marianów may refer to:

Marianów, Gmina Łanięta in Łódź Voivodeship (central Poland)
Marianów, Gmina Strzelce in Łódź Voivodeship (central Poland)
Marianów, Łowicz County in Łódź Voivodeship (central Poland)
Marianów, Gmina Aleksandrów in Łódź Voivodeship (central Poland)
Marianów, Gmina Wolbórz in Łódź Voivodeship (central Poland)
Marianów, Rawa County in Łódź Voivodeship (central Poland)
Marianów, Gmina Błaszki in Łódź Voivodeship (central Poland)
Marianów, Gmina Burzenin in Łódź Voivodeship (central Poland)
Marianów, Gmina Nowy Kawęczyn in Łódź Voivodeship (central Poland)
Marianów, Gmina Słupia in Łódź Voivodeship (central Poland)
Marianów, Lublin Voivodeship (east Poland)
Marianów, Jędrzejów County in Świętokrzyskie Voivodeship (south-central Poland)
Marianów, Kielce County in Świętokrzyskie Voivodeship (south-central Poland)
Marianów, Opatów County in Świętokrzyskie Voivodeship (south-central Poland)
Marianów, Pińczów County in Świętokrzyskie Voivodeship (south-central Poland)
Marianów, Gostynin County in Masovian Voivodeship (east-central Poland)
Marianów, Gmina Grójec in Masovian Voivodeship (east-central Poland)
Marianów, Gmina Chynów in Masovian Voivodeship (east-central Poland)
Marianów, Gmina Głowaczów in Masovian Voivodeship (east-central Poland)
Marianów, Gmina Gniewoszów in Masovian Voivodeship (east-central Poland)
Marianów, Gmina Rzeczniów in Masovian Voivodeship (east-central Poland)
Marianów, Gmina Solec nad Wisłą in Masovian Voivodeship (east-central Poland)
Marianów, Warsaw West County in Masovian Voivodeship (east-central Poland)
Marianów, Węgrów County in Masovian Voivodeship (east-central Poland)
Marianów, Wołomin County in Masovian Voivodeship (east-central Poland)
Marianów, Żyrardów County in Masovian Voivodeship (east-central Poland)
Marianów, Kalisz County in Greater Poland Voivodeship (west-central Poland)
Marianów, Turek County in Greater Poland Voivodeship (west-central Poland)
Marianów, Silesian Voivodeship (south Poland)